Goswell Road, in Central London, is an end part of the A1. The southern part ends with one block, on the east side, in City of London; the rest is in the London Borough of Islington, the north end being Angel. It crosses Old Street/Clerkenwell Road. In the north it splits Clerkenwell from Finsbury; the south was sometimes used as a demarcator but all but the southern corporate/legal/financial end in the modern era forms the heart of the highly developed mixed-use district Barbican.

All of the road is inside the Central London congestion charge zone.

Notable premises
It is mostly fronted by offices and shops, else by some buildings of City University London. It also contains the central library of the Society of Genealogists, one of London's most important reference collections,

The main campus of the university centres takes up a set of back streets, many broad and pedestrianised, west, including the large semi-garden public square, Northampton Square.

DB Cargo UK's headquarters is a building that is a merger of numbers, № 310.

A shop of the road in the 1840s was the first shop of baker and confectioner Tom Smith (1823-1869) where he popularised, and may have 'invented', the Christmas cracker.

Buses
London Bus routes serving the street:
4 and 56.

Toponymy
Some sources claim the road was named after the estate or garden written variously 'Goswelle' or 'Goderell' of (medieval noble) Robert de Ufford, 1st Earl of Suffolk; others single out "Gos-wel" to be the meaningful phonemes and so posit a very local "God's Well" (a sacred well). The Roman founding of the city (see Londinium) was in the pre-Christian years of the empire and it may have been multi-god before listed in Christian times. Until 1864 named generally Goswell Street, as in Charles Dickens' Pickwick Papers (in the novel, the protagonist Samuel Pickwick lodged there with Mrs. Bardell).

New River
The New River low aqueduct ran along Goswell Road before turning to terminate at New River Head on Rosebery Avenue. Its course is locally culverted (underground).

James Parrott and the four-minute mile
Some (notably Olympic medallist Peter Radford) contend the first successful four-minute mile was run by James Parrott on 9 May 1770. He ran the 1-mile length of Old Street to finish somewhere within the grounds/building of St Leonard's, Shoreditch (church). Timing methods at this time were - after invention of the chronometer by John Harrison - accurate enough to measure the four minutes correctly, and sporting authorities of the time accepted the claim as genuine. Old Street has a  11 foot downward fall (but note intermittent gentle undulations), and the record is not recognised by modern sporting bodies.

The Dame Alice Owen's School bombing

On 15 October 1940, approximately 150 people were sheltering in the basement of Dame Alice Owen's School, then on Goswell Road. A large parachute bomb squarely hit the building, causing majority-collapse and blocking access to the damaged basement. The blast wave from the bomb caused the New River culvert to rupture, flooding the shelter, drowning most survivors.

A memorial to the victims stands in Owen's Fields at the northern end of Goswell Road.

Image gallery

References

External links
 History of Goswell Road

Streets in the London Borough of Islington
A1 road (Great Britain)